The thirteenth season of RuPaul's Drag Race premiered on January 1 and concluded on April 23, 2021. The cast was announced via Twitter on December 9, 2020. The competition is broadcast on VH1 in the United States and showcases 13 new queens competing for the title of "America's Next Drag Superstar". VH1 renewed both RuPaul's Drag Race and its spin-off RuPaul's Drag Race All Stars for a thirteenth and sixth season respectively on August 20, 2020. Casting calls for season 13 were opened in December 2019. In addition to airing on VH1, the premiere episode was simulcast across 5 other channels: Logo, MTV, MTV2, Pop, and The CW, becoming the most-watched episode in the franchise's history.

After the season's first teaser trailer was accidentally leaked a day prior, the cast was officially revealed by season 12 winner Jaida Essence Hall on December 9, 2020. The teaser revealed that the season's premiere would consist of six "Lip-Sync for Your Life" battles in a Lip-Sync Extravaganza, along with a new socially distanced stage and  design. The season welcomed Gottmik, the show's first ever openly transgender male and assigned female at birth contestant since the series began in 2009.

The season was filmed during the COVID-19 pandemic, relying on strict protocols, including isolation and testing of contestants, judges, and crew. On February 26, 2021, the series aired Corona Can't Keep a Good Queen Down detailing the season's production amid the pandemic, including unseen footage and reflections from the cast.

The winner of the thirteenth season of RuPaul's Drag Race was Symone, with Kandy Muse as the runner-up and LaLa Ri as Miss Congeniality.

Contestants

Ages, names, and cities stated are at time of filming.

Notes:

Contestant progress

Lip syncs
Legend:

Notes:

Guest judges
Jamal Sims, choreographer (episodes 2 and 8)
Nicole Byer, stand-up comedian (episodes 3 and 5)
Loni Love, comedian and television host (episodes 4, 6, 10 and 12)
Ts Madison, LGBT activist (episodes 7 and 9)
Cynthia Erivo, English actress, singer and songwriter (episode 13)

Special guests
Guests who appeared in episodes, but did not judge on the main stage.

Episode 4
Jeffrey Bowyer-Chapman, Canadian actor and Canada's Drag Race judge

Episode 5
Stuart Vevers, British fashion designer and Coach's executive creative director

Episode 6
Miguel Zarate, choreographer

Episode 8
Anne Hathaway, American actress

Episode 9
Victoria "Porkchop" Parker, contestant on season one
Raven, runner-up of both season two and the first season of All Stars
Episode 10

 Char Margolis, author and self-proclaimed psychic medium

Episode 11
 Jaida Essence Hall, winner of season twelve

Episode 12
Norvina, president of Anastasia Beverly Hills
Valentina, contestant and Miss Congeniality on season nine
Nina West, contestant and Miss Congeniality on season eleven
Heidi N Closet, contestant and Miss Congeniality on season twelve

Episode 13
Scarlett Johansson, American actress and singer
Colin Jost, American comedian

Episode 14
Jamal Sims, choreographer

Episode 16
Jaida Essence Hall, winner of season twelve
Cory Booker, New Jersey Senator
Paris Hilton, television personality
Bob the Drag Queen, winner of season eight
Thorgy Thor, contestant on season eight and All Stars season three
Kennedy Davenport, contestant on season seven and All Stars season three
Latrice Royale, contestant on season four and All Stars season one and season four
Cynthia Lee Fontaine, contestant on season eight and season nine, Miss Congeniality on season 8
Victoria "Porkchop" Parker, contestant on season one
Eureka O'Hara, contestant on season nine and season ten
Heidi N Closet, contestant and Miss Congeniality on season twelve

Episodes

Ratings

References

2021 American television seasons
RuPaul's Drag Race seasons
Television series impacted by the COVID-19 pandemic
Impact of the COVID-19 pandemic on the LGBT community
2021 in LGBT history